Kim Myong-chol (born 1944) is a Korean writer and editor based in Japan and an unofficial spokesperson of North Korea, regularly travelling to Pyongyang and around the world portraying the North Korean leadership and politics. He was a close associate of Kim Jong-il. His articles have appeared in many publications, including Asia Times and Asia Research. Among the several books that he has written is Kim Jong-il — Military Strategy for Reunification. His books have been banned in South Korea. Currently, he is the Executive Director of CFKAP (Center for Korean-American Peace), based in Tokyo, Japan. He holds North Korean nationality and a North Korean diplomatic passport.

He has claimed variously that "North Korea has all types of nuclear bombs and warheads, atomic, hydrogen and neutron, and the means of delivery, short-range, medium-range and long-range, putting the whole of the continental US within effective range" and that "[u]nlike all the previous wars Korea fought, a next war will be better called the American War or the DPRK-US War because the main theater will be the continental US, with major cities transformed into towering infernos." Additionally, he has threatened Australia with similar results, stating "[i]f Australia becomes part of American manipulation against North Korea, North Korea reserve the right to strike back on Australia".

Works

See also
Alejandro Cao de Benós
Robert Egan
Dermot Hudson

References

Korean activists
Korean communists
Korean diplomats
Political writers
Zainichi Korean people
Date of birth missing (living people)
Living people
Year of birth missing (living people)